Boosbeck is a village in the borough of Redcar and Cleveland and the ceremonial county of North Yorkshire, England.

The name is Viking in origin and means "the stream near a cow shed".

References

External links

Villages in North Yorkshire
Places in the Tees Valley
Redcar and Cleveland